Monte Lee Pittman (born November 19, 1975) is an American musician and studio musician based in Los Angeles, known largely as Madonna's long-time guitarist and for playing for heavy metal band Prong. He has also worked as a solo artist.

Career
Pittman started playing guitar as a teenager when he received his first guitar at age 13. His guitar teacher was Robert Browning. He also took music theory and piano lessons from Delores Rhoads at the Musonia School of Music in North Hollywood.

Pittman's early musical influences came from bands and artists such as Kiss, Metallica, Slayer, Steve Vai, Jimmy Page, Pantera, The Beach Boys, Pink Floyd, and Radiohead, to name a few.

Myra Mains
Pittman's first band was called Insanity. Eventually Pittman and the singer from Insanity, Chris Sheehan, started the 4-piece Myra Mains which was much more successful, releasing 2 demo tapes and 2 full album CDs. Headquartered in Longview, TX, Myra Mains Had fans from Dallas to Shreveport and all over East Texas and truly blossomed under the unrelenting rhythm section of drummer Kevin Blalock and bassist TJ Carlson.

Madonna

Pittman moved to Los Angeles in 1999 and worked at a guitar store as a salesman. He eventually quit to start teaching guitar lessons. Pittman's third student was British film director Guy Ritchie, who had just received a guitar as a gift from his girlfriend, Madonna. Ritchie later returned the favor, buying Madonna her own guitar—and she began to take lessons from Pittman as well.

A month after Pittman started giving guitar lessons to Madonna, he was invited to join her on stage at the Late Show with David Letterman to promote her album Music. The pair played guitar together on an acoustic version of the hit song Don't Tell Me. Subsequently, Pittman was invited to join the band for Madonna's Drowned World Tour (2001). He has played in every incarnation of Madonna's live band since then.

Pittman shares writing credits with Madonna on the tracks "Easy Ride" from American Life (2003) and "It's So Cool" from Celebration (2009).

Additionally, Pittman has contributed performances to Madonna's studio recordings, appearing on 2005's Confessions on a Dance Floor (Like It Or Not) and 2008's Hard Candy (Spanish Lesson & Ring My Bell).

Apart from world tours Pittman has joined Madonna on stage in many special events, most notably at Live 8 where he played for thousands of people at Hyde Park in 2005 and at the 2007 Live Earth where he had the chance to jam "Big Bottom" with Spinal Tap, James Hetfield and Kirk Hammett among a dozen of other bass players on stage.

In 2012, he played at the Super Bowl XLVI halftime show where he debuted his new signature Jarrell MPS Guitar

Pittman started his 5th world tour with the Queen of Pop, the MDNA Tour, on May 31, 2012, in Tel Aviv, Israel and stops in Europe, North & South America till the end of 2012. Paul Oakenfold who opened for Madonna in several US shows, invited Pittman on stage to jam together in the last N.American shows of the tour.

Between September 2015 and March 2016, Pittman toured with Madonna on her Rebel Heart tour.

Prong

Pittman was introduced to Prong's Tommy Victor by White Zombie drummer Ivan de Prume; the two hit it off, and Pittman joined Prong in 2000. He played guitar on their 2002 tour that spawned the live album 100% Live. Pittman handled guitar and bass duties for the 2003 album Scorpio Rising.

On Prong's 2007 release Power of the Damager, Pittman wrote 5 of the 13 songs and provided backing vocals alongside bass duties. He is also credited as an associate producer for both Power of the Damager and the remixed version Power of the Damn Mixxxer which was released in May 2009.

Other artists
Previous to Adam Lambert's audition on American Idol, Pittman, Lambert, Tommy Victor from Prong and Steve Sidelnyk formed a band titled The Citizen Vein. For the tour of Adam Lambert's debut album, Lambert hired Pittman as his guitarist and musical director. Lambert and the band appeared on several TV shows as well as at the Gridlock New Year's Eve 2010 festival. Canada's Rock Star Weekly reviewed that "Pittman has a rock-god presence of his own, arising from his well-honed, skilled riffs that come from a connection of love and devotion to his instrument over a long and distinguished musical career" Pittman also appears on the 'Beg for Mercy' album, the material of which was recorded before Lambert went on American Idol and is co-written by Pittman and Lambert.

He has also worked in the studio with Melanie C and Sophie Ellis-Bextor

Solo

Pittman has been known to perform solo acoustic shows in between his responsibilities with Prong and Madonna. He has developed into a fiercely capable musician—equally able to hold his own in a giant pop stadium tour as in a dark and smoky club belting out brutal metal tunes. Pittman's solo work takes a giant detour from both of those avenues, venturing into melodic acoustic territory on his debut, and branching out into rock anthems.

The Deepest Dark
His debut solo album, The Deepest Dark, was released in November 2009 and features 11 songs all written by Pittman, except for "The Circle" which was co-written with Tommy Victor and Adam Lambert. All the songs are acoustic.

Almost a year after its digital release, The Deepest Dark was re-released in hard copy CD, with five additional bonus tracks. A week later, it reached the No. 1 spot on the most selling albums (Acoustic genre) on CDBaby.com and was No. 9 in the Top 10 Most Selling Albums on CDBaby for October 2010

Pain, Love & Destiny 
Pittman managed to raise $65,500 for his second solo album, Pain, Love & Destiny, through Kickstarter. He recorded the album in the summer of 2011 and Noah Shain produced it. The album features Kane Ritchotte on drums and Kelle Rhoads (Randy Rhoads's brother) on piano. It was released on October 3, 2011

The album made it to No. 1 Rock Album, No. 1 Pop Album, and the Top 10 albums chart in its debut week.

The album was also available at the Official Merchandise Booths of Madonna's 2012 MDNA Tour.

Pittman was nominated in four categories at Artists in Music Awards and by popular demand he was also invited to perform at the ceremony on February 10, 2012. He won the Award for "Best Solo Artist". He is also the recipient of a "Career Achievement Award – Guitarist" for the Hollywood F.A.M.E. Awards!

On June 29, 2012, Pittman was invited to ZDF's Morgenmagazin morning TV show where he performed a solo acoustic version of the song "Lost" from his album "Pain, Love & Destiny".

The Power of Three

Pittman started working on new material on July 1, 2012, in Copenhagen, with Danish producer Flemming Rasmussen (the producer behind Metallica's old albums). He first released an acoustic EP "M.P.3.: The Power of Three, Part 1" (released on November 19, 2012) and went back to Copenhagen in February 2013, with bandmates Kane Ritchotte and Max Whipple to record more songs with Rasmussen also producing it.

After playing the album to Metal Blade's CEO Brian Slagel, he got signed to the label to release The Power of Three in 2014.

"A Dark Horse", the first single from The Power of Three, was released on October 14, 2013, by Metal Blade Records and marks Pittman's return to his metal roots. The second single is track No. 7 on the album and is entitled "Before the Mourning Son". It was released on November 25, 2013. The final track on the album, "All is Fair in Love and War", features guitars by Testament's Alex Skolnick and additional vocals from Chris Barnes (ex-Cannibal Corpse, Six Feet Under).

The album was released on January 21, 2014 and has received many raving reviews. Music blog "The Global Onslaught" has described it as "2014's sleeping giant in the echelons of Hard Rock and Metal".

Inverted Grasp of Balance 
On 2016's Inverted Grasp of Balance, Pittman joined drummer Richard Christy and bassist Billy Sheehan.

Between the Space 
Pittman released Between the Space on Metal Blade in August 2018 and undertook a tour with Sebastian Bach of Skid Row in the USA.

Better or Worse 
At the same time Pittman released Between the Space, he released an acoustic album Better or Worse also on Metal Blade.

Equipment

Guitars
Pittman uses the Gibson Les Paul as his primary guitar. He has also been known to play Gibson SGs and he has a number of custom made Gibson electrics, acoustics, and basses—frequently specially-built for use in Madonna shows. In 2015 he signed with ESP guitars

Jarrell MPS Signature Guitar 
In December 2011, Jarrell Guitars announced that they are launching a new line, the Monte Pittman Signature Guitar and it will be presented at the 2012 NAMM. The Jarrell MPS features a custom Seymour Duncan pickup set making it one of the most versatile guitars in the market. "All together it seems Monte Pittman and Jarrell Guitars are hell bent on rocking the world – the sound of which is none other than simply amazing."

Pittman comments on the MPS, "There are 13 different sounds you can get out of it. It's the most versatile guitar I've ever played. Jarrell guitars have a very unique and distinctive sound. We have three models. The regular MPS and the MPS-f which has a Floyd Rose. They are loaded with custom Seymour Duncan pickups. There is also the MPS Classic which is the least expensive."

Amplifiers
Pittman is endorsed by Orange Amplifiers.

Effects
Like most guitarists, Pittman's effects change from show to show, but he has consistently employed the Roger Linn Adrena Linn, the Emma DiscomBOBulator, and the Keeley Compressor. He has been known to use Eventide, Boss, MXR, Crybaby, Ernie Ball, Electro-Harmonix, Digitech, Line 6, Dunlop, VoiceLive 2 by TC-Helicon and Fishman effects pedals.

Discography

Solo
Between the Space (2018)
Better or Worse (2018)
Inverted Grasp of Balance (2016)
The Power of Three (2014)
Before The Mourning Son – single (2013)
A Dark Horse – single (2013)
M.P.3: The Power of Three, Part 1 (2012)
Pain, Love, & Destiny (2011)
The Deepest Dark (with bonus tracks) (2010)
The Deepest Dark (2009)

With Madonna 
Drowned World Tour (2001)
American Life (2003)
Re-Invention Tour (2004)
Confessions on a Dance Floor (2005)
I'm Going to Tell You a Secret (2006)
Confessions Tour (2007)
Hey You (single) (2007)
Hard Candy (2008)
It's So Cool (2009) (Celebration bonus track)
Sticky & Sweet Tour (2010)
MDNA Tour (2012)
Rebel Heart Tour (2015–2016)

With Prong 
100% Live (2002)
Scorpio Rising (2003)
The Vault (2005)
Power of the Damager (2007)
Power of the Damn Mixxxer (2009)

With Myra Mains 
Condition (1996)
Buried (1999)
 Two Blocks Down from the Seventh Sign (cassette EP) (1994)
 MYRA MAINS (Eden's Way, Rape the Whirlwind, Truth, Death Is But a Bag of Chips) (self-titled cassette EP) (1992)

With other artists 

Melanie C – Reason (2003)
Sophie Ellis-Bextor – Shoot from the Hip (2003)
Adam Lambert – Take One (2005)
Run Run Run – Endless Winter (2006)
Run Run Run – Good Company EP (2007)
Jes – Disconnect (2007)
Nicki Richards – Nicki (2008)
In Extremo – Sängerkrieg (2008)
Adam Lambert – Adam Lambert Acoustic Live (2010)
Adam Lambert – Glam Nation Live (2011)
Adam Lambert – Beg for Mercy (2011)
Body Count – Bloodlust (2017)

Tours and special events 
 Drowned World Tour (2001) with Madonna
 Prong Live (2002–2003) with Prong
 MTV Video Music Awards (2003) with Madonna
 Re-Invention World Tour (2004) with Madonna
 Tsunami Aid (2004) with Madonna
 Live 8 (2005) with Madonna
 MTV Europe Music Awards (2005) with Madonna
 Grammy Awards (2006) with Madonna
 Confessions Tour (2006) with Madonna
 Live Earth (2007) with Madonna
 Slicing Across America & Europe (2007) with Prong
 Sticky & Sweet Tour (2008–2009) with Madonna
 American Music Awards (2009) with Adam Lambert
 Hope for Haiti Now (2010) with Madonna
 GLAAD Media Award (2010) with Adam Lambert
 Glam Nation Tour (2010) with Adam Lambert
 Artists in Music Awards (2011) solo
 MDNA Tour (2012) with Madonna
 From Beer to Eternity Tour with Ministry
 Rebel Heart Tour (2015–2016) with Madonna
 Monte Pittman Solo Tour (2018) with Sebastian Bach
 Monte Pittman Solo Tour (2019) with Tony MacAlpine
 Madame X Tour (2019–2020) with Madonna

Awards

Artists in Music Awards

|-
| style="text-align:center;" rowspan="4"| 2012
| style="text-align:center;" rowspan="3"| Monte Pittman
| rowspan="1"|Best Rock Artist
| 
|-
| rowspan="1"|Best Blues Artist
| 
|-
| rowspan="1"|Best Solo Artist
| 
|-
| style="text-align:center;" rowspan="1"|Pain, Love & Destiny
| rowspan="1"|Album of the Year
|

Los Angeles Music Awards

|-
| style="text-align:center;" | 2012
| style="text-align:center;" | Monte Pittman
| rowspan="1"|Male Singer/Songwriter 
| 
|-

Hollywood F.A.M.E. Awards
Pittman was honored by the Hollywood F.A.M.E. Awards with the "Career Achievement Award – Guitarist" on November 15, 2012

References

External links
 

1975 births
People from Longview, Texas
Living people
Guitarists from Texas
21st-century American guitarists
Prong (band) members